h II is the second album by Japanese producer DJ Honda. It was released on November 12, 1997 via Sony Records in Japan and on March 24, 1998 via Relativity Records and Epic Records in North America and Europe. Audio production of the album was solely handled by DJ Honda, except for three tracks of its worldwide version produced by Mista Sinista, Roc Raida and V.I.C. respectively. It featured guest appearances from various hip hop artists, including Camp Lo, Cuban Link, De La Soul, KRS-One, Mos Def and The Beatnuts among others. With DJ HONDA'S production and scratching, other hip hop artists continue to drop verses.

The album peaked at number 57 on the Billboard Top R&B/Hip-Hop Albums chart and number 16 on the Heatseekers Albums chart. It also spawned seven singles, but only two of them reached music charts: "Travellin' Man" (No. 76 on Hot R&B/Hip-Hop Songs and No. 17 on Hot Rap Songs) and "On The Mic" (No. 89 on Hot R&B/Hip-Hop Songs).

Track listing 

Sample credits
 "Trouble in the Water" contains elements from "B & G (Midwestern Nights Dream)" by The Gary Burton Quartet & Eberhard Weber (1977)
 "Disco T-E-C" contains elements from "Feels So Real (Won't Let Go)" by Patrice Rushen (1984)
 "Blaze It Up" contains elements from "Top Billin'" by Audio Two (1987)
 "Mista Sinista Interlude" contains elements from "Change the Beat (Female Version)" by Beside (1982)
 "Team Players" contains elements from "Blue Lick" by Bob James (1979)
 "When You Hot You Hot" contains elements from "If I Ever Lose This Heaven" by Coke Escovedo (1975)
 "For Every Day That Goes By" contains elements from "Did You Hear What They Said?" by Gil Scott-Heron & Brian Jackson (1972) and "Street Life" by The Crusaders & Randy Crawford (1979)
 "5 Seconds" contains elements from "Paradise" by Grover Washington, Jr. (1979)
 "Who the Trifest?" contains elements from "For Real" by Roy Ayers & Wayne Henderson (1978) and "Bring the Noise" by Public Enemy (1987)
 "Around the Clock" contains elements from "Song of Innocence" by David Axelrod (1968)
Sample credits
 "Roc Raida Intro" contains elements from "Buffalo Gals" by Malcolm McLaren (1982), "What They Hittin' Foe?" by Ice Cube (1990) and "No Equal" by The Beatnuts (1993)
 "Hai!" contains elements from "Medley: Ike's Rap III/Your Love Is So Doggone Good" by Isaac Hayes (1971) and "When I'm Gone" by The Jones Girls (1980)
 "Every Now & Then" contains elements from "Crab Apple" by Idris Muhammad (1977)
 "On the Mic" contains elements from "Mary Jane" by Rick James (1978), "La Di Da Di" by Doug E. Fresh & Slick Rick (1985), "Pass the Dutchie" by Musical Youth (1982) and "All Night Long" by Mary Jane Girls (1983)
 "Travellin' Man" contains elements from "Whatever's Fair" by Jerry Butler (1973), "Latoya" by Just-Ice (1986) and "Black Cream" by Harold Wheeler (1975)

Personnel 

 Katsuhiro Hōnda – main artist, producer, scratches, recording 
 Anthony Williams – performer ("Example" and "Roc Raida Intro"), producer & scratches ("Roc Raida Intro")
 Joel Wright – performer & producer ("Mista Sinista Interlude")
 Victor Padilla – performer ("WF II"), producer ("On The Mic")
 Peter Kang – executive producer 
 Taka Ozeki – executive producer 
 E. "DJ EV" Hitch – scratches ("Long Island To Japan" and "DJ Ev Interlude")
 Tony "CD" Kelly – keyboards ("Blaze It Up", "Hai!" and "On The Mic")
 Adrian Bartos – performer ("Stretch Armstrong And Lord Seer Interlude" and "WKCR Interlude")
 Alex Mosquera – performer ("On The Mic")
 Berntony Smalls – performer ("On The Mic", "Talk About It" and "WF II")
 Bladmillo Castillo – performer ("For Every Day That Goes By" and "Sometimes I Think...")
 C. Bullock – performer ("Around The Clock", "Kill The Noize (Remix)", "On The Mic" and "WF II")
 Dante Terrell Smith – performer ("Travellin' Man")
 David Jude Jolicoeur – performer ("Trouble In The Water")
 Derrick Lemel Stewart – performer ("Fat Lip Interlude"/"Interlude")
 Doug 'Dug Infinite' Thomas – performer ("When You Hot You Hot")
 Ernest Dion Wilson – performer ("When You Hot You Hot")
 Felix Delgado – performer ("On The Mic" and "WF II")
 Gerald W. Berlin – performer ("Hai!")
 Jeff Valentino – performer ("For Every Day That Goes By" and "Sometimes I Think...")
 Jerry "JuJu" Tineo – performer ("On The Mic", "WF II" and "Who The Trifest?")
 Keith Murray – performer ("Hai!")
 Kelvin Mercer – performer ("Trouble In The Water")
 Kia Jeffreys – performer ("Blaze It Up" and "On The Mic")
 King Doe-V – performer ("Team Players")
 Lateefa Harland – performer ("Every Now & Then")
 Lawrence Parker – performer ("Team Players")
 Lester Fernandez – performer ("Who The Trifest?")
 Lord Sear – performer ("Stretch Armstrong And Lord Seer Interlude" and "WKCR Interlude")
 Rashawnna Guy – performer ("Every Now & Then")
 S-On – performer ("Go Crazy")
 Saladine Wallace – performer ("Disco T-E-C")
 Salahadeen Wilds – performer ("Disco T-E-C")
 Sean Black – performer ("5 Seconds", "Blaze It Up", "Fuk Dat", "On The Mic" and "WF II")
 Chris Conway – mixing & recording
 Dino Zervos – recording
 Kirk Yano – recording
 Tom Coyne – mastering
 Ill Tongue – management
 Hideo Oida – photography
 Piotr Sikora – photography

Charts

Release history

References

External links 

1997 albums
DJ Honda albums
Sequel albums
Relativity Records albums
Sony Music Entertainment Japan albums
Albums produced by DJ Honda